The Warren Reservoir is a water storage created by a dam on the South Para River in the Mount Lofty Ranges of South Australia. It is a few kilometres south of Williamstown on the Birdwood road. It was built between 1914 and 1916. There are various trails and activities around the reservoir.

References

Dams completed in 1916
Dams in South Australia
Reservoirs in South Australia